Chattanooga Football Club is an American professional soccer team based in Chattanooga, Tennessee, United States. Founded in 2009, the team began play in the National Independent Soccer Association (NISA) in Spring 2020. Prior to joining the NISA, the club played in the Southeast Division of the National Premier Soccer League (NPSL), a national amateur league at the fourth tier of the American Soccer Pyramid. 

In early 2019, the club made history by becoming the first to offer ownership shares to the public and its fans under the crowdfunding rules of JOBS Act. In its attempt to raise $1 million, the team has currently raised more than $870,000 and has owners from all over the world.

The team plays its home games at Finley Stadium, where they have played since 2009. The team's colors are navy blue and white. In January 2017, reflecting the growing awareness and influence of Chattanooga FC, German-based VfL Wolfsburg signed a letter of intent to partner with Chattanooga FC, which includes women's football, youth development, and local social responsibility. The two teams mentioned the future possibility of international friendlies.

History

Initial seasons (2009–2013)
Chattanooga FC was founded in 2009 by Tim Kelly, Krue Brock, Marshall Brock, Paul Rustand, Sean McDaniel, Daryl Heald, Hamilton Brock, Thomas Clark and Sheldon Grizzle to play in the National Premier Soccer League (NPSL), the fourth tier of the American soccer pyramid and considered roughly equal to the USL Premier Development League. The team completed its inaugural season third in the Southeast Division with 4 wins and 3 losses.

After the struggles of its first season, Chattanooga FC's run in 2010 included winning the conference and it got them to the NPSL finals. The season ended with a loss in the 2010 NPSL Championship game to the Sacramento Gold by a score of 3–1. After a disappointing 3rd-place finish to the 2011 season and missing the playoffs, Chattanooga FC came back stronger than ever in 2012, taking 1st place in the newly created South Southeast Conference West, and defeating the reigning NPSL champion Jacksonville United FC 4–1 in Jacksonville to clinch it.  Because of a collapse of the South-South Central Conference structure, a one-game playoff to determine the South Conference Champion was held with the Georgia Revolution, the victors of the South Southeast Conference East in Conyers, GA.  Chattanooga won the game 1-0 on Luis Trude's 72nd-minute goal to advance to the 2012 NPSL National Finals in San Diego, CA. After defeating the Bay Area Ambassadors 3–2, and advancing to the NPSL Championship game, Chattanooga lost again in the title game 0-1 to FC Sonic on a header in the 78th minute.  This was the 2nd NPSL Championship game that Chattanooga FC lost.

Chattanooga FC's 2013 season started with the expansion of the South Region into four divisions, with Chattanooga placed in the Southeast Division of the South Conference with 5 other teams. Chattanooga again prevailed at the top of the division, but because of one loss, had to go on the road for the Regional Playoffs. Chattanooga traveled to Tulsa, Oklahoma to face the undefeated and top seeded Tulsa Athletics who won the South Central Division. After a 0–0 draw, the match went to penalty kicks. Keeper Greggaa Hartley converted an incredible 3 saves in 3 chances, and Chattanooga made all 3 of their chances to advance to the Regional Final in Richmond, VA. Chattanooga FC lost the Regional Final 1-0 to eventual NPSL champions RVA Football Club. For the 2013 season, 4 Chattanooga FC members were selected to the 2013 All-NPSL Team - more than any other team. Those players were:  GK Greggaa Hartley, DF Andrew Stewart, DF Nicholas Chase, and MF Fynn Glover. MF Thibault Charmey was also included in the NPSL Supporter's XI along with Hartley, Stewart, and Glover.

Continued success and Hank Steinbrecher Trophy (2014–2017) 

2014 started with former Chattanooga FC player Mark Sherrod being drafted by the Houston Dynamo of Major League Soccer in the second-round of the 2014 MLS SuperDraft. For the season, Chattanooga FC launched a Women's Soccer Team in the WPSL for the first time.  In their inaugural season, the women's team finished 5-3-2, for third in the Southeast. Chattanooga FC's regular season started off slow, but ended with 5 straight wins to close the season on top of the division once again by goal difference over the Atlanta Silverbacks Reserves.  For 2014, the playoff format changed to a playoff to determine the Southeast Champions.  The playoff was hosted by Chattanooga as the regular season champions. Chattanooga defeated Nashville FC 6-1 and then the New Orleans Jesters 4-0 to advance to the Regional Playoffs.

Although given the lowest seed in the Regional Playoffs, Chattanooga also played host to the Regional Playoffs. Chattanooga went on to defeat top seeded Miami United F.C. 2-0 and the Tulsa Athletics once again 2–0 in a rematch of 2013's Regional Match. Chattanooga would next host the Sacramento Gold in a rematch of the 2010 NPSL Championship game. They would end up rallying from an early 0–1 deficit to win 4–1, advancing to the finals for the third time in the club's existence. Chattanooga FC lost to the New York Red Bulls U-23 3–1. Forward Luke Winter and keeper Gregory Hartley were named to the All-NPSL squad, with Hartley also taking home honors with the NPSL Golden Glove award.  Head Coach Bill Elliot was also awarded the Alexander Arellano Memorial Trophy for top NPSL Coach.

The 2015 season saw 2014 standout midfielder Niall McCabe sign with Louisville City FC in March. Chattanooga FC was also selected to host the US Soccer Amateur Championships on May 29–30, also known as the Hank Steinbrecher Trophy, in a competition matching the previous years winners of PDL, NPSL, and USASA Open and Amateur Championships. In May, CFC opened league play winning the first two matches on the road in Georgia. U.S. Open Cup play started at home against Ocala Stampede in the first round.  After a late goal by Luke Winter to tie the game in regulation, the game went to extra time, with Gregga Hartley saving two penalties, and converting the winning one himself.  Hartley was named TheCup.us 's Player of the Round.

The 2nd round of the Cup was away at Wilmington Hammerheads, and went to penalty kicks again after 1–1 in regulation.  Chattanooga converted all 5 kicks, and saved one of Wilmington's to advance to host Atlanta Silverbacks once again in 3rd Round. Chattanooga FC took the lead late in the game on a Luke Winter header, but a controversial penalty was called just a minute later.  Atlanta equalized and won the game in Extra Time, 2-1 the final. Just 2 days after the defeat Chattanooga FC hosted the Maryland Bays, the 2014 USASA Open Cup Champions, for the opening game for the Hank Steinbrecher Trophy tournament.  Chattanooga won that game 2–0, and the next day defeated the Michigan Bucks, the 2014 PDL season Champions 3-0 to win the trophy, Chattanooga FC's first. On August 8, 2015, Chattanooga FC and Finley Stadium hosted the NPSL National Championship between CFC and New York Cosmos B. The game drew a U.S. amateur soccer attendance record with 18,227 fans witnessing a thrilling match won by the Cosmos, 3–2 in extra time. In 2016, Chattanooga FC won all of its games 9-0 and was first in the Southeast Division. The team advanced to the Southeast Conference playoffs, where they beat Memphis City FC 2–1. After the win over Memphis, Chattanooga FC managed to advance to the Regional Finals of the NPSL Playoffs, where they won in a penalty shootout to Miami United FC 5–3.

In January 2017, Chattanooga FC announced a partnership with VfL Wolfsburg, which plays in the German Bundesliga, and has plans to have international friendlies with the team.

Transitioning to professional status (2018–present) 

A professional USL League One franchise, later named the Chattanooga Red Wolves, was established in 2018. Chattanooga FC accused the new team of trying to take over the local market after they hired then-current general manager Sean McDaniel. The Red Wolves also unsuccessfully attempted to arrange a lease at Finley Stadium and takeover of Chattanooga's youth academy. The city's women's team was transferred to the Red Wolves organization in 2019. Also of note, the Red Wolves were sent a cease and desist letter by Arkansas State in November 2019 in reference to the East Ridge team's use of the university's trademarked name.

On November 15, 2018, the NPSL announced that it was creating a new, fully professional division and that Chattanooga would be one of its founding teams. In anticipation of moving to a professional roster and schedule, Chattanooga began a fan ownership initiative that was partially modeled after the Green Bay Packers. The initiative raised more than $800,000 with almost 3,000 new owners for the club from all 50 states and 25 different countries.

On August 15, 2019, it was announced that Chattanooga FC would instead join the National Independent Soccer Association. In preparation for the team's move to the professional ranks it was announced that Jeremy Alumbaugh, formerly the general manager of Saint Louis FC, as the team's managing director, while Bill Elliot would transition from his role as coach to Technical Director and Peter Fuller would take over the head coach role full-time.

Supporters and attendance
The predominant supporters' group of Chattanooga FC is known as the Chattahooligans . Over the years, the supporter group has established several traditions, which the club has incorporated into home match proceedings such as a pregame Chattahooligan march-in and the a cappella leading of the National Anthem.

Chattanooga FC boasts the highest average and single-game attendance in the NPSL. In its inaugural match on May 16, 2009, over 1,600 fans watched Chattanooga FC host Atlanta FC. In their second home match, held on June 7, 2009, over 1,500 watched as CFC notched their first win in club history over Saturn FC. Over 2,100 fans watched as CFC tied eventual divisional champs Rocket City United on June 20, 2009. In their final home game of the season, held July 4, 2009, over 3,000 fans witnessed CFC's victory over Birmingham, Alabama's Pumas FC. The club's average season attendance for league games was approximately 2,100. In its second season, CFC continued to build upon its remarkably high attendance figures. In the season-beginning league match-up against Pumas FC on June 5, 2010, attendance numbers hit over 3,000. The second league game on June 19, 2010, drew over 2,900 fans to witness CFC host Atlanta FC. On July 4, 2010, an NPSL record crowd of over 3,400 watched CFC take on league newcomer FC Tulsa. CFC beat all NPSL attendance records, for a regular season game, on July 17, 2010 when 5,117 fans watched the CFC roll over Rocket City United, 4 - 0. The club's average attendance for their second season was approximately 4,400 per game (including a 6,317 home attendance count against non-league opponent F.C. Atlas's Under-20 squad.)

In 2014, Chattanooga FC continued its high attendance, drawing more than 3,000 in the final two home games of the regular season, as well as US Open Cup attendance of 4,058 against the Atlanta Silverbacks.  Hosting the Southeast Division conference tournament, Chattanooga FC games drew 3,101 against Nashville FC and 2,802 against New Orleans Jesters.  In hosting the South Region tournament, the game against Miami United F.C. drew 2,011 in heavy rain, and 3,218 against Tulsa Athletics, putting total attendance at over 25,000 for the season. On July 26, 2014, the team set a league attendance record of 8,878 during their playoff against the Sacramento Gold. In 2015, Chattanooga opened their home schedule against Ocala Stampede in the 1st round of the 2015 Lamar Hunt U.S. Open Cup with just under 2500 in attendance, likely the highest attended match in the round.  After 4 home matches, Chattanooga FC had already drawn 10,000 for the season. In 2015, 18,227 came to the Finley Stadium for the match between Chattanooga FC and New York Cosmos B. It became a US 4th tier record. In February 2017, MLS expansion club Atlanta United came to Chattanooga for a friendly, which drew approximately 12,400 fans to Finley Stadium.

Rivalries
For the 2014 Season with 3 Tennessee clubs in the NPSL, the Chattahooligans, working with Nashville FC's main supporters group developed a rivalry trophy between Chattanooga FC, Nashville FC, and Knoxville Force called the "Volunteer Shield". Memphis City FC was added to the trophy upon its joining the NPSL in 2016. The Volunteer Shield is presented at the end of each season to the supporters of the club that takes the most points in games against one another, with a medallion added to the trophy commemorating the season.

Chattanooga FC has won the Volunteer Shield 4 times in the last 5 years: 2014, with a record of 4-1-0 against Nashville and Knoxville, 2015 with the same 4-1-0 record,  2016 with a 6-0-1 record, including against Memphis City FC, and 2018 with a perfect 4-0-0 record against Knoxville and Inter Nashville FC.

Starting in 2017, Chattanooga FC will compete with Asheville City SC for the "Blue Ridge Derby".

Players and staff

Current roster

Technical staff

Team management

Notable former players
  Mark Sherrod
  Niall McCabe
  Sean McFarlane
  Thomas Hunter

Year-by-year

Honors

Domestic
National Independent Soccer Association
NISA Independent Cup
 Southeast Region:
 Champion (2): 2020, 2021, 2022
NISA Legends Cup
 Runners-up (1): 2021
National Premier Soccer League
National
 Runners-up (4): 2010, 2012, 2014, 2015
South Region:
 Champions (3): 2014, 2015, 2016
 Runners Up (1): 2013
Southeast Conference:
 Champions (8): 2010, 2012, 2013, 2014, 2015, 2016, 2018, 2019
United States Adult Soccer Association
U.S. Soccer National Amateur Championship:
 Hank Steinbrecher Cup
 Champions (1): 2015
 Runners Up (1): 2016

Head coaches
  Brian Crossman (2009–2011)
  Bill Elliott (2012–2019)
 Peter Fuller (2019–2021 )
  Rod Underwood (2022–)

Stadium
 Finley Stadium; Chattanooga, Tennessee (2009–present)

See also 

 NPSL Founders Cup

References

External links
 

National Premier Soccer League teams
Soccer clubs in Tennessee
Sports in Chattanooga, Tennessee
2009 establishments in Tennessee
Association football clubs established in 2009
National Independent Soccer Association teams